Tyrosine-protein kinase ABL2 also known as Abelson-related gene  (Arg) is an enzyme that in humans is encoded by the ABL2 gene.

Function 

ABL2 is a cytoplasmic tyrosine kinase which is closely related to but distinct from ABL1.  The similarity of the proteins includes the tyrosine kinase domains and extends amino-terminal to include the SH2 and SH3 domains.  ABL2 is expressed in both normal and tumor cells. The expression of ABL2 gene is higher in KRAS mutant non-small cell lung cancer. The ABL2 gene product is expressed as two variants bearing different amino termini, both approximately 12-kb in length.

Interactions 

ABL2 has been shown to interact with three proteins: Abl gene, catalase, and SORBS2. The protein Abl gene is also known as abelson murine leukemia viral oncogene homolog 1 and is a protein that is encoded by the human ABL1 gene. Catalase is a common enzyme that catalyzes the decomposition of hydrogen peroxide to water and oxygen. SORBS2 is also known as Sorbin and SH3 domain-containing protein 2 and is a protein encoded by the SORBS2 gene in humans.

References

Further reading

External links
 
 
 ABL2 Info with links in the Cell Migration Gateway
 

Tyrosine kinases
Oncogenes